Open Sans is an open source humanist sans-serif typeface designed by Steve Matteson, commissioned by Google and released in 2011. It is based on his previous Droid Sans design, designed for Android mobile devices, but slightly wider.

Featuring wide apertures on many letters and a large x-height (tall lower-case letters), the typeface is highly legible on screen and at small sizes. Because it belongs to the humanist genre of sans-serif typefaces, it has a true italic. As of July 2018 it is the second most served font on Google Fonts, with over four billion views per day on more than 20 million websites.

In March 2021, the family was updated to a variable font family, including Hebrew characters.

Use 
Open Sans is popular in flat design-style web design.

Open Sans is used in some of Google's web pages as well as its print and web advertisements. It is the official font of the UK's Labour, Co-operative, and Liberal Democrat parties.

Used in WordPress 3.8 which was released on December 12, 2013.

Development
According to Google, it was developed with an "upright stress, open forms and a neutral, yet friendly appearance" and is "optimized for legibility across print, web, and mobile interfaces." Its design is similar to that of Matteson's Droid Sans, created as the first user interface font for Android phones, but with wider characters and the inclusion of italic variants. Explaining the different name, Matteson has said "Droid was intentionally narrow for mobile screens but it didn't have 'narrow' in the name. Open Sans isn't really 'extended' so that wasn't really an option either. A new family name is the direction they chose."

Unicode support 
The character repertoire contains 897 glyphs, covering the Latin, Greek and Cyrillic alphabets with a wide range of diacritics.

In January 2014, Israeli type designer Yanek Iontef released an extension font covering the Hebrew alphabet with support for Niqqud (but not Cantillation marks) for early access. The extension font went on to become popular and to be used by prominent institutions such as Tel Aviv University in its 2016 rebranding, and by the Haaretz website. Hebrew support was added in March 2021.

Derivatives 
Open Sans has six weights (Light 300, Normal 400, Medium 500, Semi-Bold 600, Bold 700 and Extra Bold 800), each of them with an italic version, totaling 12 versions, although the Medium and Medium Italic styles are not yet accepted into Adobe Fonts. It has a number of stylistic alternates, such as a capital 'i' with a serif (for situations where this could be confused with a number '1' or lower-case 'L') and a selectable choice between a single and double-storey 'g'. Numbers can be set as tabular or proportional lining figures or as proportional text figures.

Open Sans Condensed 
Open Sans Condensed has three styles: light, bold and light italic.
As of 2021, the "Regular", "Semibold", and "Extra Bold" versions have been released to GitHub, but not yet accepted into Google Fonts or Adobe Fonts.

Open Serif 
Matteson designed Open Serif, a companion slab serif typeface family. While Open Serif is not open-source, the font is sold by Matteson Typographics, owned by Steve Matteson and released on August 26, 2016.

Open Sans Soft 
On March 23, 2021, Matteson released a rounded version of Open Sans called Open Sans Soft. Like Open Serif, it is not an open-source font and is sold by Matteson Typographics. In contrast to the original open-source Open Sans, the capital 'i' with a serif is the default glyph for that letter, with the glyph without a serif as a stylistic alternate for it.

See also
Droid Sans
Noto fonts

References

External links
 Google Fonts Open Sans
 Open Sans in GitHub

Typefaces and fonts introduced in 2011
Humanist sans-serif typefaces
Digital typefaces
Typefaces with text figures
Open-source typefaces
Typefaces designed by Steve Matteson